Mar Athanasius College is a general degree college located in Kothamangalam, Kerala. It was established in the year 1955. The college is affiliated with Mahatma Gandhi University. This college offers different courses in arts, commerce and science.

Departments

Post graduate departments of science

Physics
Chemistry
Mathematics
Botany
Statistics
Zoology
Actuarial Science
Microbiology
Biotechnology
Biochemistry
Data analytics
Integrated biology

Arts and Commerce

Malayalam
English
Hindi
Sociology
[[History
Political science
Economics
Commerce

Physical Education

Mar Athanasius College football team is the first college team in Kerala to qualify for the Kerala Premier League..

Accreditation
The college is recognized by the University Grants Commission (UGC).

Notable alumni
 Eldhose Paul, International Athlete

References

External links
http://www.macollege.in

Universities and colleges in Ernakulam district
Educational institutions established in 1955
1955 establishments in India
Arts and Science colleges in Kerala
Colleges affiliated to Mahatma Gandhi University, Kerala